The Liechtensteinian records in swimming are the fastest ever performances of swimmers from Liechtenstein, which are recognised and ratified by the Liechtenstein Swimming Association (LSchV).

All records were set in finals unless noted otherwise.

Long Course (50 m)

Men

Women

Short Course (25 m)

Men

Women

References
General
 Liechtensteinian Long Course Records – Men 26 March 2022 updated
 Liechtensteinian Long Course Records – Women 29 July 2021 updated
 Liechtensteinian Short Course Records – Men 3 April 2022 updated
 Liechtensteinian Short Course Records – Women 16 October 2021 updated
Specific

External links
 LSchV web site

Liechtenstein
Records
Swimming